The Peru team was a minor league baseball team based in Peru, Indiana in 1890. The Peru team played as members of the eight–team Independent level Indiana State League and were without a team moniker, common in the era.

History
Peru, Indiana began minor league play in 1890. The Peru team joined the 1890 eight–team Independent level Indiana State League as the league reformed. Teams from Anderson, Bluffton, Elkhart, Fort Wayne Reds, Kokomo, Marion and Muncie joined Peru in beginning league play.

As was common in the era, the "Peru Baseball Club" had no formal nickname.

On July 24, 1890, the Indiana State League folded after the Bluffton and Elkhart teams had disbanded, leaving the league with six teams. Peru finished last in the standings. Peru completed the season with a record of 25–35, playing under managers Charles Farrell, Ace Stewart, Louis Johnson and Edward Egan to place 6th, finishing 11.5 games behind the 1st place Anderson team.

The final 1890 Indiana State League standings were leb by Anderson (38–25), followed by Muncie (33–29), the Fort Wayne Reds (33–30), Kokomo (29–29), Marion/Logansport (29–29) and Peru (25–35). Bluffton (25–21) and Elkhart (14–28) weren't counted in the final standings after folding.

Peru, Indiana has not hosted another minor league team.

The ballpark
The name of the 1890 Peru home ballpark is not directly referenced.

Year-by-year records

Notable alumni
Hal Mauck (1890)
Ace Stewart (1890)

See also
Peru (minor league baseball) players

References

External links
Baseball Reference

Defunct minor league baseball teams
Professional baseball teams in Indiana
Defunct baseball teams in Indiana
Baseball teams established in 1890
Baseball teams disestablished in 1890
Miami County, Indiana
Indiana State League teams